The Institute for Historical Review (IHR) is a United States-based nonprofit organization which promotes Holocaust denial. It is considered by many scholars to be central to the international Holocaust denial movement. Self-described as a "historical revisionist" organization, the IHR promotes antisemitic viewpoints and has links to several neo-Nazi and neo-Fascist organizations.

The group was founded in 1978 in Torrance, California, by David McCalden and Willis Carto, and is headquartered in Fountain Valley, California. It published the Journal of Historical Review until 2002, but now disseminates its materials through its website and via email. The parent corporation of the IHR and the affiliated Noontide Press is the Legion for the Survival of Freedom.

In 2009, IHR director Mark Weber published an article questioning the relevance of "Holocaust revisionism" in general, triggering infighting in the movement.

History
The IHR was founded in 1978 by David McCalden, also known as Lewis Brandon, a former member of the British National Front, and Willis Carto, the head of the now-defunct Liberty Lobby. Liberty Lobby was an antisemitic organization best known for publishing The Spotlight, now reorganized as the American Free Press. Austin App, a La Salle University professor credited with being the first major American holocaust denier, inspired the creation of the IHR.

The Anti-Defamation League describes its founding and early years:

The Institute for Historical Review and its publishing arm, Noontide Press, were founded in 1978 by the leading organizer of modern American anti-Semitism, Willis Carto, and his wife Elisabeth. Based near Los Angeles in Torrance, California, the group pioneered organizing efforts among Holocaust deniers, who had heretofore labored mostly in isolation and obscurity. The group's first "Revisionist Convention" in September 1979 featured speakers from the U.S., France, Germany, England and Sweden, many of whom subsequently contributed articles to the inaugural issue of IHR's Journal of Historical Review the following spring. With the Noontide Press offering a means for the sale and distribution of their writings, professional deniers had found something of a rainmaker in Carto.

McCalden and Carto had a falling out over the Mel Mermelstein case, and in 1981 McCalden left the IHR. Tom Marcellus became its director. Carto lost control of IHR in 1993, in an internal power struggle. in 1971, Marcellus was a field staff member for the Church of Scientology and was an editor for one of the church's publications. When Marcellus left IHR in 1995, Mark Weber, the editor of the IHR's Journal of Historical Review (JHR) since 1992, took over as its director, and has been the IHR's director and spokesman since then. Weber previously worked with the white supremacist National Alliance. Since taking over, Weber has continued to publish writing on the Holocaust and on World War II.

At the IHR's first conference in 1979, IHR publicly offered a reward of $50,000 for verifiable "proof that gas chambers for the purpose of killing human beings existed at or in Auschwitz." This money (and an additional $40,000) was eventually paid in 1985 to Auschwitz survivor Mel Mermelstein, who, represented by public-interest lawyer William John Cox, sued the IHR for breach of contract for initially ignoring his evidence (a signed testimony of his experiences in Auschwitz). On October 9, 1981, both parties in the Mermelstein case filed motions for summary judgment in consideration of which Judge Thomas T. Johnson of the Superior Court of Los Angeles County took "judicial notice of the fact that Jews were gassed to death at the Auschwitz Concentration Camp in occupied Poland during the summer of 1944." On August 5, 1985, Judge Robert A. Wenke entered a judgment based upon the Stipulation for Entry of Judgment agreed upon by the parties on July 22, 1985. The judgment required IHR and other defendants to pay $90,000 to Mermelstein and to issue a letter of apology to "Mr. Mel Mermelstein, a survivor of Auschwitz-Birkenau and Buchenwald, and all other survivors of Auschwitz" for "pain, anguish and suffering" caused to them.

On July 4, 1984, a firebomb destroyed the institute's offices and warehouse. Thousands of books, cassette tapes, pamphlets, and 90% of its inventory were lost. Carto had not insured the facilities or stock.

In 1996, IHR won a $6,430,000 judgment in a lawsuit against Carto in which IHR alleged that Carto embezzled $7.5 million that had been left to Legion for the Survival of Freedom, the parent corporation of IHR, from the estate of Jean Edison Farrel.

In 2001, Eric Owens, a former employee, alleged that Mark Weber and Greg Raven from the IHR's staff had been planning to sell their mailing lists to either the Anti-Defamation League or the Church of Scientology.

Since 2009, Weber has pushed to broaden the institute's mandate. In January 2009, Weber released an essay titled, "How Relevant Is Holocaust Revisionism?" In it, he acknowledged the death of millions of Jews but did not wholly reject Holocaust denial. He noted that Holocaust denial had attracted little support over the years: "It's gotten some support in Iran, or places like that, but as far as I know, there is no history department supporting writing by these folks." Accordingly, he recommended that emphasis be placed instead on opposing "Jewish-Zionist power", which some commentators claim was a shift to a directly antisemitic position.

Holocaust denial
Although the IHR comments on a variety of subjects, it is most criticized for its Holocaust denial. IHR is widely regarded as antisemitic and as having links to neo-Nazi organizations. Multiple writers have stated that its primary focus is denying key facts of Nazism and the genocide of Jews.

When the IHR devoted itself to publishing Holocaust-denial material, it insisted that its work in this regard was "revisionism" rather than denial:

The Institute does not "deny the Holocaust." Every responsible scholar of twentieth century history acknowledges the great catastrophe that befell European Jewry during World War II. All the same, the IHR has over the years published detailed books and numerous probing essays that call into question aspects of the orthodox, Holocaust-extermination story, and highlight specific Holocaust exaggerations and falsehoods.

On the IHR website, Barbara Kulaszka defends the distinction between "denial" and "revisionism" by arguing that considerable revisions to history have been made over the years by historians and concludes:

For purposes of their own, powerful, special-interest groups desperately seek to keep substantive discussion of the Holocaust story taboo. One of the ways they do this is by purposely mischaracterizing revisionist scholars as "deniers."

American environmentalist Paul Rauber wrote:

The question [of whether the IHR denies the Holocaust] appears to turn on IHR's Humpty-Dumpty word game with the word Holocaust. According to Mark Weber, associate editor of the IHR's Journal of Historical Review [now Director of the IHR], "If by the 'Holocaust' you mean the political persecution of Jews, some scattered killings, if you mean a cruel thing that happened, no one denies that. But if one says that the 'Holocaust' means the systematic extermination of six to eight million Jews in concentration camps, that's what we think there's not evidence for." That is, IHR doesn't deny that the Holocaust happened; they just deny that the word 'Holocaust' means what people customarily use it for.

According to British historian of Germany Richard J. Evans:

Like many individual Holocaust deniers, the Institute as a body denied that it was involved in Holocaust denial. It called this a 'smear' which was 'completely at variance with the facts' because 'revisionist scholars' such as Faurisson, Butz 'and bestselling British historian David Irving acknowledge that hundreds of thousands of Jews were killed and otherwise perished during the Second World War as a direct and indirect result of the harsh anti-Jewish policies of Germany and its allies'. But the concession that a relatively small number of Jews were killed [has been] routinely used by Holocaust deniers to distract attention from the far more important fact of their refusal to admit that the figure ran into the millions, and that a large proportion of these victims were systematically murdered by gassing as well as by shooting.

In 2007, the United Kingdom's Channel 4 described the IHR as a "pseudo-academic body based in the United States which is dedicated to denying that the Holocaust happened," while the Pittsburgh Post-Gazette called the IHR a "blatantly anti-Semitic assortment of pseudo-scholars".

The Southern Poverty Law Center lists the IHR as a hate group. In an article for The Jewish Chronicle, British writer Oliver Kamm, described the IHR as being "a pseudo-scholarly body". The British Holocaust denier David Irving delivered a speech to the organisation's congress in 1983. Irving returned to speak at IHR conferences on at least four more occasions, in 1989, 1990, 1992, and 1994.

Connections with Arab, Islamic opponents of Israel

Issa Nakhleh, an attorney who has served as U.N. Observer of the Arab Higher Committee for Palestine, who already in 1972 openly denied the Holocaust, and, "who, during the 1960s and early 1970s, was associated with Gerald L.K. Smith (writing for Smith’s publication, The Cross and the Flag), and with the racist West Coast group, Western Front, in 1981, . . spoke at the Third Annual Convention of the Institute for Historical Review, . . ." Described as the "chairman of the Palestine-Arab Committee," he was a highlighted speaker and in 1982, he published an article for IHR.

In an article published in Hit List magazine in 2002, author Kevin Coogan claimed there had been attempts to forge ties between American and European Holocaust-denial groups such as the IHR and "radical Middle Eastern extremists." According to Coogan, Ahmed Rami, a former Moroccan military officer "founded Radio Islam to disseminate antisemitic, Holocaust denying, and often pro-Nazi propaganda," and tried to organize, with the IHR, a conference in a Hezbollah-controlled section of Beirut, Lebanon.

The Daily Star, the leading English-language paper in Lebanon, in response to a planned IHR meeting in the country, called its members "loathsome pseudo-historians" and the institute itself an "international hate group." The paper reported "one former PLO official [stating], 'with friends like that, we don't need enemies'." With the help of the anti-Israeli Jordanian Writers Association, an alternative event was held with the theme "What happened to the Revisionist Historians' Conference in Beirut?"

Criticism of methods
The "Holocaust revisionist" arguments published by the IHR are not regarded as serious historical research by mainstream historians and academics; rather, they are regarded as works of pseudo-science aimed at proving that the Holocaust did not happen. The editorial board of one of the leading historical journals, The Journal of American History, wrote, "We all abhor, on both moral and scholarly grounds, the substantive arguments of the Institute for Historical Review. We reject their claims to be taken seriously as historians." In response, IHR printed Weber's letter disputing the claims.

In April 2004, following a complaint by the David S. Wyman Institute for Holocaust Studies, The Nation magazine refused to accept advertising from the IHR, stating "[T]here is a strong presumption against censoring any advertisement, especially if we disagree with its politics. This case, however, is different. Their arguments are 'patently fraudulent. Weber responded with critical commentary in a letter to Leigh Novog of the advertising department of The Nation.

Journal of Historical Review
The IHR published the Journal of Historical Review, which its critics – including the ADL, the Danish Center for Holocaust and Genocide Studies, and other scholars, such as Robert Hanyok, a National Security Agency historian – accused of being pseudo-scientific. Hanyok described IHR as "a well-known forum for that faction of scholars and researchers associated with a movement known as 'Holocaust denial'".

The journal History Teacher wrote of the Journal of Historical Review that the "magazine is shockingly racist and antisemitic: articles on 'America's Failed Racial Policy' and anti-Israel pieces accompany those about gas chambers ... They clearly have no business claiming to be a continuation of the revisionist tradition, and should be referred to as 'Holocaust Deniers'."

The journal commenced publication in the spring of 1980 as a quarterly periodical. No issues were published between April 1996 and May 1997, after which publication continued until 2002. Publication of the journal ceased in 2002, due to "lack of staff and funding", according to the organization's website.

Weber was the editor of JHR from 1992 to 2002, when the JHR ceased publication. Since 2002, the IHR's main method of spreading its message has been through its website IHR Update and by e-mail.

References

External links
Willis Carto and the IHR (critical site hosted by the Nizkor Project)
Institute for Historical Review (IHR): Outlet for Denial Propaganda (critical site hosted by the Anti-Defamation League)
The Mad Revisionist (spoof of the IHR and its Journal of Historical Review)

Historical negationism
Holocaust denial in the United States
Holocaust-denying websites
Jewish-American history
Organizations established in 1978
1978 establishments in California
Non-interventionism